The 2016 Craven District Council election took place on 5 May 2016 to elect members of Craven District Council in England. This was on the same day as other local elections.

Ward results

Aire Valley with Lothersdale

Barden Fell

Cowling

Grassington

Ingleton and Clapham

Settle and Ribblebanks

Skipton East

Skipton North

Skipton South

Skipton West

Upper Wharfedale

By-elections between 2016 and 2018
A by-election was held in Aire Valley with Lothersdale on 4 May 2017 after the resignation of Conservative councillor Patricia Fairbank. The seat was won by Green Party candidate Andrew Brown.

References

2016 English local elections
2016
2010s in North Yorkshire